Scary or Die is a 2012 American anthology horror film directed by Bob Badway, Michael Emanuel, and Igor Meglic. The film was released on video on demand on May 1, 2012 and on DVD on September 11, 2012. Initially titled Terror Bytes, the film's name was later changed to coincide with a horror website by the same name that Emanuel ran with his co-director Igor Meglic and two other filmmakers.

The anthology stars Corbin Bleu and Bill Oberst Jr. and is composed of five interlocking stories set within the city of Los Angeles.

Synopsis

The Crossing
Buck (Bill Oberst Jr.) and his friends have made a pastime of patrolling the Mexico–United States border in search of anyone they believe to be an illegal immigrant. Upon catching someone, the group murders them and buries the body in the hopes of sending out a personal message to anyone else that wants to enter. However what they couldn't predict is that their victims might rise from the grave to take their revenge.

TaeJung's Lament
A lonely widower finds himself unable to cope with the loss of his wife and begins to follow around various women that resemble her. On one such occasion he ends up becoming a witness to a woman's kidnapping. The man rescues her and in gratitude, the woman urges him to meet her one night. Unknown to him, the woman and her friends are all vampires who are being hunted by Van Helsing himself.

Re-Membered
A dirty cop (Christopher Darga) has been asked to serve as a hitman for a man's murder, which he does. He dismembers the body and stows it in his trunk for later disposal, but is shocked when he begins to find evidence that his victim is somehow still alive.

Clowned
When Emmett (Corbin Bleu), a wayward drug dealer, gets bitten by Fucko (Domiziano Arcangeli), a flesh-eating clown at a family member's birthday party, the last thing he expects is for that bite to begin a horrifying transformation. As his transformation proceeds, Emmett is horrified to find that he has a newly acquired taste for human flesh.

Lover Come Back
A woman returns from the grave in order to seek revenge on the cheating husband who caused her death. As she moves towards her final task, she begins to recollect their relationship and how everything went wrong.

Cast

Corbin Bleu as Emmett
Bill Oberst Jr. as Buck
Domiziano Arcangeli as Fucko
Shannon Bobo as The Walking Woman
Bob Bouchard as Fucko 2
Andrew Caldwell as Bill Blotto
Alexandra Choi as Min-ah
Charles Rahi Chun as TaeJung
Erik Contreras as Gonzalez Jr.
Christopher Darga as Detective Franks
Xavier Davis as Andy
Elizabeth Di Prinzio as Kelly
Hali Lula Hudson as Connie
Azion Iemekeve as Van Helsing
David Reivers as Gran Pere

Reception
Ain't It Cool News gave Scary or Die a positive review, stating that "Reminiscent of old school films like Creepshow with its practical effects and unflinchingly wicked tales, this is one indie film worth seeing by as many folks as possible." Dread Central gave a more mixed review and remarked that while they enjoyed the segments Clowned and Re-Membered, they found most of the segments disappointing and could really only recommend it for Clowned. HorrorNews.net criticized the film's segments, commenting that some would serve well as excellent student films but that "this is a commercial release, and the bar is higher."

References

External links
 
 

2012 films
2012 horror films
Films about cannibalism
Films scored by Christopher Young
Films set in Los Angeles
American horror anthology films
Horror films about clowns
American zombie films
American vampire films
American films about revenge
American monster movies
American vigilante films
American exploitation films
American splatter films
2010s English-language films
2010s American films